Galileo Regio is a large, dark surface feature on Jupiter's moon Ganymede.

It is a region of ancient dark material that has been broken apart by tectonism and is now surrounded by younger, brighter material (such as that of Uruk Sulcus) that has been upwelling from Ganymede's interior. It is thought to be some 4 billion years old and is heavily cratered and palimpsested, but  also has a unique distribution of furrows and smooth terrain that has been the subject of conflicting speculation regarding cause or origin.  The distribution of smooth terrain on Galileo Regio suggests that the ancient crust of Ganymede was relatively thin in the equatorial region and thickened poleward in this area. The age relationships, morphology, and geometry of the furrow systems do not favor an origin by impact or tidal stressing. A possible, but speculative, origin is crustal uplift caused by a plume-like convection cell in a fluid mantle underlying a thin crust. Stratigraphic and morphologic relationships among furrows and crater palimpsests suggest that palimpsest morphology is largely the result of impact into a rheologically weak crust rather than viscous relaxation.

The regio is bounded on the southwest by Uruk Sulcus, which lies between it and Marius Regio. Within Galileo Regio itself lies the palimpsest Memphis Facula, a relic of an impact crater that has been flattened in a manner characteristic of some of the Solar System bodies with icy crusts.

References

 Harland, D. M.; Jupiter Odyssey, Springer Praxis (2000), p. 141
 Casacchia, R., and R. G. Strom (1984), Geologic evolution of Galileo Regio, Ganymede, J. Geophys. Res., 89(S02), B419–B428, doi:10.1029/JB089iS02p0B419.

Surface features of Ganymede (moon)
Ganymede (moon)